This article provides details of international football games played by the Slovakia national football team from 2020 to present.

Results

2020

2021

2022

Notes

References

Slovakia national football team
2020s in Slovak sport